Grant James Sullivan (born 7 March 1984 in Mackay, Queensland) is a former professional Australian cricketer who played for Queensland.

External links
 Cricinfo profile – Grant Sullivan

1984 births
Australian cricketers
Living people
Sportspeople from Mackay, Queensland
Queensland cricketers
Cricketers from Queensland